Piscobamba may refer to places in Peru:

Piscobamba, a town, capital of the Mariscal Luzuriaga province
Piscobamba District, a district of the Mariscal Luzuriaga province